Goel Ratzon (born 19 September 1950) is an Israeli polygamist who led a cult in Hatikva Quarter in south Tel Aviv. As the cult leader, Ratzon had 21 wives, who bore him 49 children. In September 2014, Tel Aviv-Yafo District Court convicted Ratzon of rape, fraud and other offences against his wives and daughters. He was sentenced to 30 years' imprisonment.

Early life 
Ratzon was born in Hatikva Quarter to parents who immigrated to Israel (Aliyah) from Yemen. He had a number of odd jobs, such as a renovation working and vehicle mechanic. In 1972 he married a woman with whom he had five children. At the beginning of the 1980s, he met another woman with whom he had five more children. Starting in 1991, he became famous as a spiritual healer and as a proficient in Kabbalah while gathering many women to a cult. Some of these women introduced their female friends and relatives to Ratzon's cult. In these years, he earned his living from funds transferred to him by his wives, either salaries of their work as housewives or their income support as single mothers from Israel's national social security agency, Bituah Leumi. According to Ratzon, he had romantic relationships with his women.

Formation of the cult 
The daily life of Ratzon's cult was exposed to the public on 11 February 2009, by Israeli journalists Shelley Tapiro and Nesli Barda of Israeli TV Channel 10. Tapiro had received Ratzon's permission, after negotiating with him, to video record inside his house in 28 Ahima'ats Street at Hatikva Quarter in Tel Aviv. A day after broadcasting Tapiro and Barda's report, Ratzon was interviewed by Israeli TV Channel 2 and claimed that he had only assisted women who needed his help and nothing else. Nine of his sons and daughters were named after him, such as Goel ("Redeemer"), Yigal ("He will redeem"), Geula ("Redemption"), Yigaela (a feminine version of Yigal), Adoneinu HaGoel ("Our Lord the Redeemer") and Goeleliya ("God Redeemer"). The cult resided in several houses, in which Ratzon periodically visited. In each house, domestic duties were shared between the women. From time to time, Ratzon chose one of his wives to spend the night with him.

The exposure gained the interest of the public and the media, and while many considered it as a cult Ratzon and his wives claimed it to be a cooperative. Some of the wives praised Ratzon and compared their lifestyle with the routine of the Kibbutzim during the establishment of Israel.

Some of Ratzon's wives had said in public that they adored him. Many of them tattooed his name on their arms, as well as his face portrait. They had declared that without Ratzon, there was no meaning for their life. Ratzon said that if someone had given him the same treatment that he gave his wives then he would have trusted him with his life. Ratzon's neighbours claimed that he had hypnotized his wives.

In an article published by Israeli newspaper Maariv, it was mentioned that Ratzon's wives were obliged to obey a detailed set of rules which Ratzon had written in a secret document called "The Book of the Family." All of the wives had to repeat reading this document weekly without telling anyone else about it. Near every rule in the document, a fine was mentioned for disobeying it: up to 7,000 NIS for each. In some sections of this document, Ratzon referred to himself as God and called his children "Sons of God." Some of his wives declared him as the Messiah. Ratzon had tried to renounce this imagery in public and explained their gratitude for him only as a reaction for his giving solely. The rules covered many aspects of life, which included the education of the children, daily management of the housekeeping, and the order of the sexual relations with Ratzon. According to these rules, the women had to dress modestly and were allowed to neither look at nor talk to other men. They were also not allowed to touch each other or other women. They were forbidden to smoke, to drink alcoholic beverages and to eat meat. Ratzon also abstained from eating meat.

Most of Ratzon's wives were not in contact with their families, as they did not accept the life they had adopted. Some of the families used private investigators and filed complaints against Ratzon, but they didn't achieve any results. According to an article on Israeli radio station Galei Tzahal, Ratzon's wives declared themselves as single parents and consequently gained some benefits.

Arrest and conviction 
Ratzon was taken under arrest on 12 January 2010 by Israeli police, being suspected for slavery and sexual assaults against minors. Galit, one of the wives who left him, whose two sisters also participated in his community, had filed a complaint against him for raping her when she was a minor in age of 14. After receiving Galit's complaint, the police had been keeping Ratzon and his wives under surveillance using hidden cameras and eavesdropping. In one of the recorded conversations, it he noted he had sexual intercourse with one of his daughters. After Ratzon's arrest, his wives and children were evacuated from Ratzon's house to women's shelter, aided by the welfare services. In an interview after his arrest, he claimed that his relationships with his wives were based on love and respect.

On 8 September 2014, Tel Aviv-Yafo District Court convicted Ratzon of most of the sexual assaults with which he had been charged, but acquitted of the slavery charge. On 28 October 2014, he was sentenced for 30 years. Ratzon filed an appeal to the Supreme Court of Israel, which was denied on 18 July 2016.

Ratzon is considered an endangered prisoner, and for that he is moved between prisons occasionally. His wives and children broke off their relations with him, except for his son Yigal who supports him and declared that he would rebuild his father's harem.

See also

 Haredi burqa sect

References

Bibliography

External links 
 חופשיות אצל רצון: על כת הנשים של גואל רצון [Liberated at Ratzon's: about the women's cult of Goel Ratzon]. Maariv (in Hebrew). 2009-02-23.
 גואל רצון - הסרט המלא [Goel Ratzon - The Full Movie]. 13 news (in Hebrew). 2018-02-12.
 יום הדין של גואל רצון: מהי עבדות? [Goel Ratzon's Day of Punishment: What is slavery?]. ynet (in Hebrew).  2014-09-01.
 הגואל ועונשו [The "Goel" and his punishment]. www.yediot.co.il (in Hebrew). 2017-03-27.

Living people
1950 births
Israeli people convicted of rape
Israeli people convicted of indecent assault
People from Tel Aviv
Israeli people of Yemeni-Jewish descent
Polygamy
People convicted of sodomy
People convicted of incest
Incidents of violence against girls
Incidents of violence against women